Lamman Rucker  (born October 6, 1971) is an American actor. Rucker began his career on the daytime soap operas As the World Turns and All My Children, before roles in The Temptations, Tyler Perry's films Why Did I Get Married?, Why Did I Get Married Too?, and Meet the Browns, and its television adaptation. In 2016, he began starring as Jacob Greenleaf in the Oprah Winfrey Network drama series, Greenleaf. Rucker is married to Kelly Davis Rucker, a graduate of Hampton University. , he stars in BET+ drama The Black Hamptons.

Early life
Rucker was born in Pittsburgh, Pennsylvania, the son of Malaya (née Ray) and Eric Rucker. He has partial ancestry from Barbados. Rucker spent his formative years in the greater Washington, DC, Maryland area. He first had an interest in acting after he was placed in many child pageants.  His first acting role was as Martin Luther King in the 4th grade. He was in the drama club in 7th grade and then attended high school at the Duke Ellington School of the Arts in Washington, D.C. Rucker studied at Carnegie-Mellon University and Duquesne University.

On August 29, 2019, he shared personal life experiences that he credits for his success with the Hampton University football team.

Career
His major role came in 2002 when he assumed the role of attorney T. Marshall Travers on the CBS daytime soap opera As the World Turns opposite Tamara Tunie. He left the series the following year and portrayed Garret Williams on ABC soap opera All My Children in 2005. He also had the recurring roles on the UPN sitcoms All of Us and Half & Half.

Rucker is best known for his roles in the Tyler Perry's films. He co-starred in Why Did I Get Married? (2007) and  Why Did I Get Married Too? (2010). He played Will Brown in 2008 film Meet The Browns. He later had a starring role on Perry's sitcom Meet the Browns reprising his role as Will from 2009 to 2011. The following year after Meet the Browns, Rucker was cast in the male lead role opposite Anne Heche in the NBC comedy series Save Me, but left after pilot episode. He later had roles in a number of small movies and TV movies. Rucker also had regular role opposite Mena Suvari in the short-lived WE tv drama series, South of Hell.

In 2015, Rucker was cast as one of leads in the Oprah Winfrey Network drama series, Greenleaf. He plays Jacob Greenleaf, the eldest son of Lynn Whitfield' and Keith David's characters.

Filmography

Film

Television

Award nominations

References

External links
 

1971 births
Living people
Male actors from Pennsylvania
African-American male actors
American people of Barbadian descent
American male film actors
American male soap opera actors
American male television actors
Carnegie Mellon University alumni
Duquesne University alumni
21st-century American male actors